Megasyrphus laxus  (Osten Sacken 1875), the black-legged gossamer fly, is an uncommon species of syrphid fly observed throughout North America. Hoverflies can remain nearly motionless in flight. The  adults are also  known as flower flies for they are commonly found on flowers, from which they get both energy-giving nectar and protein-rich pollen. Larvae are unknown.

References

Diptera of North America
Syrphinae
Syrphini
Hoverflies of North America
Insects described in 1875